Reinhart Jan Maria Ceulemans (born 15 January 1954 in Antwerp, Belgium) is an emeritus professor of Ecology and previous director of the Research Center of Excellence PLECO of the University of Antwerp. He has been vice-dean of the Faculty of Sciences at the University of Antwerp, and was a visiting professor at the University of Washington, Seattle, USA (1987-1988), at the Université Paris-Sud XI, Orsay (France, 1989) and at the University of Ghent (Belgium, 2013–2019). He officially retired in October 2019 and is now a visiting professor at the University of Antwerp (Belgium), a researcher at CzechGlobe Academy of Sciences in Brno (Czech Republic) and an international consultant to the Slovenian Forestry Institute (Ljubljana, Slovenia).

Issues of study 
His research focused primarily on ecophysiological responses of trees to increasing CO2 concentrations as well as on the use of poplar and willow plantations for bioenergy, which increased the understanding of the importance of natural ecosystems in managing the global environmental crises.

Renewable (bio-)energy production from poplar 
Based on the improved knowledge of the biological aspects of productivity in poplar, he expanded his research after 1990 toward the production of bioenergy from poplar. He investigated the entire production chain, from the establishment of the biomass plantation to the final production of renewable energy. The focus was on the cultivation of poplar in intensively managed, high-density short rotation coppice (SRC). He brought the concept of producing bioenergy from SRC with fast-growing poplar trees to fruition and identified the principal yield determinants of poplar for bioenergy... 
In 2009, Ceulemans obtained an Advanced Grant of the European Research Council, POPFULL, to conduct a full system analysis of a bioenergy plantation. For the first time a full balance of all greenhouse gases (CO2 and the non-CO2 greenhouse gases as CH4 and N2O) as well as a full life cycle assessment were made during several rotations of an operational (20 ha) SRC plantation of poplars and willows. These research efforts proved the high potential of bioenergy from the plantation farm to the conversion plant, i.e. a climate change mitigation strategy and also became an ERC success story

Impact of global changes on plants and ecosystems 
From 1990 onward Ceulemans extended his research to the response of poplar and other plants to global environmental changes. He quantified, measured and modeled the responses to the effects of elevated CO2 and climate warming using different techniques such as growth chambers, open-top chambers, Free-air concentration enrichment (FACE) within the framework of the European funded research programs POPFACE and EUROFACE. This work showed that plants profit from a rising atmospheric CO2 concentration with a mean biomass stimulation of 30%, but also indicated that acclimation counteracts and mitigates most of this stimulation

Biosphere – atmosphere fluxes 
Since 1996 his research group got actively involved in the quantification of fluxes between ecosystems and the atmosphere for a better understanding of ecosystem responses to global changes. He was an active participant in various European flux programs, incl. CARBO-EUROPE IP. From 2013 to 2019 Ceulemans was the Belgian Focal Point of the Integrated Carbon Observation System research infrastructure and coordinated the Belgian network of observation stations.

Leadership and director of Research Center of Excellence 
From 2000 to 2019 Ceulemans led the Research Group of Plant and Vegetation Ecology (PLECO, Department of Biology, University of Antwerp). In 2007 the research group was recognized as a Research Center of Excellence at the University of Antwerp. As the director of the Research Center, he also became the Methusalem titular with long-term funding from the Flemish Government through the University of Antwerp (2007-2019). He was chairman of the Department of Biology (2004-2006), vice dean of the Faculty of Sciences (2006-2009) and chair of various international evaluation and selection committees, including the European Science Foundation (ESF). Under his supervision a total of 28 PhD's were defended.

Awards and honors 
In 1990, he received the Scientific Achievement Award of the International Union of Forest Research Organizations (IUFRO).

During the academic year 2006-2007 he was titular of the Belgian Francqui Chair at the Université Catholique de Louvain (UCL). As a Francqui Chair he taught various courses and classes on forest ecophysiology, the ecology and genetics of poplar, plant ecology and related.

He was elected a member of the Royal Flemish Academy of Belgium for Science and the Arts (since 2009)

On 27 April 2010, he received the academic title of Doctor Honoris Causa at Mendel University of Brno (Czech Republic) from the Faculty of Forestry and Wood Sciences. Two years later – on 15 March 2012 – he became Doctor Honoris Causa at the Université d’Orléans, France.

In 2015, he was elected a corresponding member of the Slovenian Academy of Sciences and Arts (since 2015)

Publications and output 
By 2019, Ceulemans was the lead author or co-author of over 345 publications in peer-reviewed scientific journals, as well as the (co-)editor of nine books on plant responses to environmental factors and tree physiology. He also co-authored over 50 publications in scientific volumes, proceedings and popularizing journals. His publications have been cited over 30 000 times and he has an H-index of 83 on Google Scholar. He served as associate editor for four international, peer-reviewed journals, i.e. Tree Physiology; Annals of Forest Science; Forest Ecology and Management; Plant, Cell and Environment.

Selection of publications 

Invited Tansley review, providing a comprehensive review of the major physiological responses of trees to elevated CO2. This enabled the development of process-based models for the prediction of global change effects on forest ecosystems. It has been cited more than 600 times. 

This work showed that trees can profit from atmospheric CO2 concentrations with a mean biomass stimulation of 30%, despite the variability between experiments and species. The authors also gave proof of the fact that acclimation counteracts and mitigates most of this stimulation. It has been cited more than 400 times.

This work summarizes the exchange fluxes of carbon between the terrestrial biosphere and the atmosphere for European forests. It has been cited more than 1100 times.

This work assessed the carbon sink in Europe's terrestrial biosphere; it was estimated at 135 to 205 teragram per year. This work has been cited over 500 times.

This study reviews the available literature on the energy and greenhouse gas balance of bioenergy production. It has been cited over 100 times.

References

External links 
 University of Antwerp
 ERC Advanced Grant POPFULL
 

1954 births
Living people
Academic staff of the University of Antwerp
Ecologists
21st-century Belgian scientists
20th-century Belgian scientists
Members of the Slovenian Academy of Sciences and Arts
Members of the Royal Flemish Academy of Belgium for Science and the Arts